Iridopsis cypressaria is a species of geometrid moth in the family Geometridae.

The MONA or Hodges number for Iridopsis cypressaria is 6571.

References

Further reading

 

Boarmiini
Articles created by Qbugbot
Moths described in 1917